Fairy Tail: 100 Years Quest is a Japanese manga series written and storyboarded by Hiro Mashima, and illustrated by Atsuo Ueda. It is a sequel to Mashima's Fairy Tail series, focusing on Natsu Dragneel and his team from the titular wizard guild as they aim to complete an unfinished, century-old mission. The manga was launched in Kodansha's Magazine Pocket manga app in July 2018, and is licensed by Kodansha USA for an English release in North America. As of November 2022, thirteen tankōbon volumes have been released in Japan. An anime television series adaptation has been announced.

Plot
One year following the demise of Zeref and Acnologia, Natsu Dragneel and his team from the Fairy Tail wizard guild embark on the 100 Years Quest, a mission that has been unaccomplished for over a century, on the northern continent of Guiltina. There the team learns that their mission is to seal the Five Dragon Gods, a group of dragons whose power rivals Acnologia's and threatens to cause worldwide destruction. Meanwhile, Fairy Tail recruits a new member named Touka, who is possessed by a witch that aims to seize the dragons' powers for her own purposes.

Characters

Elefseria is the founding master of  Earth-land's first wizard guild, located on the northern continent of Guiltina. He serves as Fairy Tail's client for the 100 Years Quest, which he issued following a failed attempt at defeating the Five Dragon Gods by teaching himself Dragon Slayer magic, resulting in his transformation into a dragon. As such, he has remained alive for the 160 years since making his request, using magic to assume his original human appearance. As the  he possesses knowledge of all things in the world.

 
Touka is an Exceed girl who is possessed by Faris, a human shrine maiden who pretends to be the  – the missing leader of the white magic cult  – with her ability to steal others' magic and erase it or control their minds, for which she is thought to be as dangerous as Zeref, the Black Wizard. Both Touka and Faris are originally from a parallel universe called Elentear, which Faris attempts to save from the dragon god Selene by erasing powerful sources of magic in Earth-land, including Fairy Tail and the Five Dragon Gods, using Touka's "Aqua Aera" magic to travel between worlds. Touka appears to be enamored with Natsu, who unknowingly saved her from bandits during his training journey, but is later revealed to be in love with Happy, having mistaken Natsu's name as his.

The  are a group of dragons who survived the Dragon King Festival by fleeing to Guiltina to hide from Acnologia. Since then, they are each considered to have become as strong as Acnologia, and are viewed as deities by Guiltina's citizens. Several of the dragons have the ability to assume humanoid forms. To prevent them from causing a potential catastrophe, the object of the 100 Years Quest is for wizards to seal the dragons away.
  is the  who possesses power over the moon and stars, as well as the ability to freely travel between different parallel worlds. She desires to be reborn as a human, and manipulates Faris and Diabolos into helping her eliminate the other Dragon Gods to achieve her goal, entertaining herself with the ensuing destruction in the process.
Having trained himself to defeat Acnologia as a test of strength, he becomes determined to turn Natsu into a worthy opponent for himself upon learning of his foster brother's victory over Acnologia, disappointed by Natsu's reliance on his friends' power.
  is the  worshiped by the people of the seaside town Ermina for his power over the ocean. He is a peaceful dragon who abandoned his cruel and violent nature after befriending a human girl named , whom he lives with. However, his diminishing control over his magic causes the tide to submerge Ermina at night, leading him to transform its citizens into fish to help them survive. After falling under the White Mage's control, he goes on a mindless rampage in his dragon form until he is defeated by Natsu, which permanently turns him into a powerless human.
  is the  whose gargantuan body serves as the foundation of Drasil, Guiltina's largest city. Each of Drasil's five towns houses an orb that seals his destructive power, with the White Mage and Diabolos being misled by false claims that destroying the orbs would weaken him. He is protected by humanoid trees called "God Seeds" that possess various powers, with the strongest serving as Aldoron's brain and avatar.
  is the  whose powers are unknown.
His remains are the source of an underground labyrinth called the Great Labyrinth of Dogra, which is made of indestructible stone.

 is a guild of "fifth-generation" Dragon Slayers called Dragon Eaters who gain their abilities by consuming dragons.

The guild's strongest force is the  a team of four Dragon Eaters who were given the powers of dragons killed by Georg. Its members are:
 , a swordsman with archaic speech patterns who uses sword techniques that move faster than the naked eye.
 , a woman with the telekinetic ability to tear objects.
 , a young boy who manipulates yarn and transforms others into plush dolls.
 , a man who controls air and carries a coffin on his back.

Members ranked beneath the Dragon Slayer Knights include:
 , a woman who creates magical blades that cut through anything.
 , an armored man with an indestructible body.
 , a man who uses ash-based magic to create and disintegrate objects.
 , a bestial man with spider-like abilities.
 , a spirit who is imperceptible to anyone except other Dragon Slayers.

Production
Following the conclusion of Fairy Tail on July 26, 2017, Hiro Mashima posted a tweet on April 5, 2018, announcing that sequel to the series was being developed as a spin-off manga, although he did not specify that he would be returning as the illustrator. On June 27, Mashima announced that the manga was tentatively titled , which was confirmed on July 4 to be drawn by Atsuo Ueda with original storyboards provided by Mashima.

Media

Manga
The manga was launched with two chapters in Kodansha's Magazine Pocket manga app on July 25, 2018, under the title Fairy Tail: 100 Years Quest, while the first chapter was simultaneously published in the 34th issue of Weekly Shōnen Magazine. On August 28, 2018, Ueda tweeted that chapters would be released every two weeks beginning on September 5, 2018. The manga was published for an English language release by Kodansha USA in August 2019.

Chapters not yet in tankōbon format
These chapters have yet to be published in a tankōbon volume. They were originally serialized in Magazine Pocket app from October 2022 to March 2023.

Anime
An anime television series adaptation was announced during the "Hiro Mashima Fan Meeting" livestream on September 11, 2021.

Works cited
 "Ch." and "Vol." are a shortened forms for chapter and volume of the Fairy Tail: 100 Years Quest manga

Notes

Japanese

References
References

External links

Adventure anime and manga
Anime series based on manga
Comics about magic
Fairy Tail
Fantasy anime and manga
Fictional guilds
Japanese webcomics
Kodansha manga
Shōnen manga
Upcoming anime television series
Webcomics in print